Swimming at the 2011 Island Games was held from 27–30 June 2011 at the Medina Leisure Centre. The events are held in a long course (50 m) pool.

Events

Medal table

Men

Women

Mixed

References
Swimming at the 2011 Island Games

2011 Island Games
2011 in swimming
2011